Keith Grogono (4 November 1912 – 22 March 1999) was a British sailor. He competed in the Star event at the 1936 Summer Olympics.

References

External links
 

1912 births
1999 deaths
British male sailors (sport)
Olympic sailors of Great Britain
Sailors at the 1936 Summer Olympics – Star
People from Stratford, London